Forced degradation or accelerated degradation is a process whereby the natural degradation rate of a product or material is increased by the application of an additional stress.

Introduction 

Forced degradation studies are used to identify reactions which may occur to degrade a processed product.  Usually conducted before final formulation, forced degradation uses external stresses to rapidly screen material stabilities.

Longer-term storage tests are usually used to measure similar properties when final formulations are involved because of the stringent FDA regulations.  These tests are generally more expensive (because of the time involved) than forced degradation which is therefore used for rapid selection and elimination tests.

Common stresses 

There are a number of common stresses which are used to

 pH (acid/base)

Chemical processes are often catalysed by the presence of acids and bases.  The exposure of materials to these can therefore accelerate degradation reactions.

 Temperature

In accordance to arrhenius kinetics, increasing temperature increases the rate of any degradation process.  Temperature is often used in conjunction with other stresses to increase reaction rates.

 Oxidation 
 Concentration 
 Light

Methodologies 

Standard methodologies include:

 Wet chemistry methods
 Flow chemistry
 Calor

Application 

To demonstrate the specificity when developing stability indicating method.
To help to identify reactions that cause degradation of pharmaceutical product.
As a part of method development strategy.
Are designed to generate product related variants.

See also 

 Chemical decomposition
 Thermogravimetric analysis
 Total productive maintenance

External links
 Flow chemistry degradation by Syrris

Chemical process engineering